Buick (also known as Buick Creek) is a community in North-Eastern British Columbia, Canada.

References

Populated places in the Peace River Regional District
Peace River Country
Unincorporated settlements in British Columbia